Arachnura, also known as drag-tailed spider, scorpion-tailed spider and scorpion spider, is a genus of orb-weaver spiders that was first described by A. Vinson in 1863. They are distributed across Australasia, Southern and Eastern Asia with one species from Africa. The name is a combination of the Ancient Greek "arachne-" and "uro", meaning "tail". The tails are only present on females, but unlike the common names suggests, these spiders aren't related to scorpions. They curl up their tails when disturbed, but they are completely harmless. Bites are rare, and result in minor symptoms such as local pain and swelling. They stay at the middle of their web day and night, and their bodies mimic plant litter, such as fallen flowers, twigs, or dead leaves.

Arachnura logio is called Kijiro o-hiki-gumo in Japanese. A. feredayi is commonly called Tailed forest spider. A. higginsi is often found in large numbers near water in Australia.

Species
 it contains twelve species, found in Africa, Oceania, and Asia:
Arachnura angura Tikader, 1970 – India
Arachnura feredayi (L. Koch, 1872) – New Zealand
Arachnura heptotubercula Yin, Hu & Wang, 1983 – China
Arachnura higginsi (L. Koch, 1872) – Australia
Arachnura logio Yaginuma, 1956 – China, Korea, Japan
Arachnura melanura Simon, 1867 – India to Indonesia (Sulawesi) and Japan, Papua New Guinea, Australia (Queensland)
Arachnura perfissa (Thorell, 1895) – Myanmar
Arachnura pygmaea (Thorell, 1890) – Indonesia (Nias Is.)
Arachnura quinqueapicata Strand, 1911 – Indonesia (Aru Is.)
Arachnura scorpionoides Vinson, 1863 (type) – Congo, Ethiopia, Seychelles, Mayotte, Madagascar, Mauritius, Réunion
Arachnura simoni Berland, 1924 – New Caledonia
Arachnura spinosa (Saito, 1933) – Taiwan

In synonymy:
A. longicauda Urquhart, 1885 = Arachnura feredayi (L. Koch, 1872)

See also
 List of Araneidae species: A

References

External links

 Pictures of A. logio
 Pictures of A. higginsii with eggsac (Archived 2009-10-25)
 Drawing of A. higginsi
 Pictures of A. melanura
 Picture of male and female A. higginsi

Araneidae
Araneomorphae genera